Patrick James Coleman McNair (born 27 April 1995) is a Northern Irish professional footballer who plays as a defender or a midfielder for Championship club Middlesbrough and the Northern Ireland national team.

McNair signed for Manchester United in 2011 and made his professional debut for them in the Premier League in September 2014. In August 2016, McNair joined Sunderland with Donald Love in a joint transfer deal for £5.5 million. Two years later, he signed for Middlesbrough.

Having represented Northern Ireland at under-17, under-19 and under-21 levels, McNair made his senior debut for Northern Ireland in March 2015. He was selected in their squad at UEFA Euro 2016, where they reached the Round of 16.

Club career

Manchester United
Born in Ballyclare, County Antrim, McNair began playing with Ballyclare Colts and was first discovered by Manchester United's Northern Ireland-based scout, Tony Coulter, when McNair was 12, and began travelling to train with United during his school holidays. He eventually signed for the club in 2011, having impressed the club scouts in a midfield role for Ballyclare Colts, but was later converted into a defender by United youth coach Paul McGuinness. While making the transition from midfield to defence, McNair was frequently compared to Michael Carrick by McGuinness.

McNair made his senior debut for United on 27 September 2014 against West Ham United in a 2–1 victory in the Premier League at Old Trafford, starting the game due to an injury crisis in defence. He was praised by fans and manager Louis van Gaal for his solid defending in that match, including a vital headed clearance while United were down to 10 men.

Despite McNair's inexperience in England's top division, Manchester United won all of the first four matches when McNair was in the starting line-up. On 4 January 2015, McNair was in the starting line-up for a FA Cup third round tie with Yeovil Town which concluded with a 2–0 result, playing as a right-back in a 3–5–2 formation. He started again in the same formation and role for a later round of the tournament against Cambridge United that ended 3–0. Following his impressive performance, Van Gaal publicly praised McNair and claimed that he could go on and establish himself as the new Gary Neville, suggesting he could be a regular in that position for the next decade. On 10 February 2015, he signed a new contract with Manchester United, keeping him at the club until June 2017.

On 28 November 2015, after being kept out of the starting lineup by the consistency and form of Manchester United's back four, McNair made his first start of the 2015–16 season for Manchester United alongside team-mates Daley Blind and Chris Smalling in a three-man defence against Leicester City. The match ended in a 1–1 draw.

Sunderland
On 11 August 2016, McNair signed a four-year contract with Sunderland after a £5.5 million joint deal was agreed with Manchester United for McNair and Donald Love. Two days later, he made his debut in an away fixture against Manchester City, coming on as a substitute in the 83rd-minute for Jermain Defoe. The match eventually ended 2–1 in Manchester City's favour, with McNair netting an own goal during his defence against a cross from Jesús Navas. McNair scored a brace for Sunderland in their 2–1 EFL Cup third round win against Queens Park Rangers on 21 September, his first two professional goals. On 20 November, McNair ruptured his ACL in a 3–0 win over Hull City and Sunderland stated it was likely that he would miss the remainder of the season.

After over 11 months absence, McNair returned to action on 28 October 2017, playing 11 minutes as a substitute in a 2–1 home loss to Bristol City in the Championship. Three days later he scored his first league goal of his career, equalising in a 3–3 draw with Bolton Wanderers at the Stadium of Light four minutes after coming on in place of Darron Gibson. The Sunderland Echo praised his second season, which ended with the club's second consecutive relegation.

Middlesbrough
On 26 June 2018, McNair signed a four-year deal at Championship club Middlesbrough, for a fee that could rise past £5 million. He made his debut in the first game of the season, a 3–0 win over Sheffield United on 7 August in which he came on in the 71st minute for Jonathan Howson. He scored his first goal for Middlesbrough in a 1–1 draw with Millwall on 24 August. On 22 May 2021, McNair was named Middlesbrough Player of the Year for the 2020–21 season.

International career
On 4 November 2014, McNair was called up to the Northern Ireland senior team for the first time, ahead of a UEFA Euro 2016 qualifying match away to Romania, but did not play. He made his debut on 25 March 2015 in a friendly against Scotland at Hampden Park, playing the entirety of a 1–0 defeat. He made his competitive debut on 4 September 2015 in a 3–1 away win over the Faroe Islands in a European qualifier.

On 8 October 2015, McNair was drafted into the starting line-up for a UEFA Euro 2016 qualifying match against Greece. Northern Ireland went on to secure a decisive 3–1 victory, qualifying for the competition, a first major tournament the team would have qualified for in thirty years. After the final qualifying match, a 1–1 away draw with Finland on 11 October 2015, McNair remained in a Helsinki hospital due to concerns of a ruptured liver.

On 24 March 2016, McNair was selected in the starting line-up for an international friendly against Wales, which subsequently ended in a 1–1 draw. Notably, McNair was deployed in a holding midfielder role instead of his more conventional position as a central defender. Following his display in the match, Northern Ireland head coach, Michael O'Neill, "believes midfield could be where McNair's future lies".

On 28 May 2016, McNair was selected as part of the 23-man squad to represent Northern Ireland at UEFA Euro 2016. He was selected to start for Northern Ireland's opener against Poland in Nice, but was substituted at half time for compatriot Stuart Dallas in an eventual 1–0 loss. He came on in added time for the next match, in a 2–0 win over Ukraine, but did not feature again for the rest of the competition. The Northern Ireland national team was eventually eliminated in the Round of 16, after a 1–0 loss to Wales.

McNair scored his first international goal against Belarus in a UEFA Euro 2020 qualifier on 11 June 2019, and followed it up with two more in a 3–2 friendly win away to the Czech Republic on 14 October.

Career statistics

Club

International

International goals
Scores and results list Northern Ireland's goal tally first.

Honours
Individual
 Middlesbrough Player of the Year: 2020–21

References

External links

Paddy McNair profile at the Sunderland A.F.C. website
Paddy McNair profile at the Irish Football Association website

1995 births
Living people
People from Ballyclare
Sportspeople from County Antrim
Association footballers from Northern Ireland
Northern Ireland youth international footballers
Northern Ireland under-21 international footballers
Northern Ireland international footballers
Association football defenders
Association football midfielders
Manchester United F.C. players
Sunderland A.F.C. players
Middlesbrough F.C. players
Premier League players
English Football League players
UEFA Euro 2016 players